Gašparci is a village in Croatia, located in the border with Slovenia.

References

Populated places in Primorje-Gorski Kotar County